Bothriospora is a monotypic genus of flowering plants in the family Rubiaceae. The genus contains only one species, viz. Bothriospora corymbosa, native to Guyana, Venezuela, Colombia, Ecuador, Perú and northern Brazil.

References

External links
Bothriospora in the World Checklist of Rubiaceae

Monotypic Rubiaceae genera
Dialypetalantheae
Plants described in 1841
Flora of Guyana
Flora of Brazil
Flora of Peru
Flora of Ecuador
Flora of Colombia
Flora of Venezuela
Taxa named by Joseph Dalton Hooker